MGIC Investment Corporation  ("MGIC") is a provider of private mortgage insurance in the United States. The company is headquartered in Milwaukee, Wisconsin.

In addition to mortgage insurance, MGIC provides lenders with various underwriting and other services and products related to home mortgage lending. Today, MGIC serves lenders in the United States, Puerto Rico and Guam with obtaining mortgage insurance.

The company's key executives are Pat Sinks (Chief Executive Officer), Steve Mackey (EVP Chief Risk Officer), Paula Maggio (EVP General Counsel and Corporate Secretary), Tim Mattke (EVP and Chief Financial Officer), Jay Hughes (EVP Sales and Business Development), Sal Miosi (EVP Business Strategy and Operations).

History
In 1957, the company was founded in Milwaukee by Max H. Karl, a real estate attorney who noticed that his clients were having trouble paying for their new homes. Karl invented modern private mortgage insurance and secured US$250,000 from investors, including friends and business associates, to open MGIC. In 1982, Karl sold the company to Baldwin United for $1.2 billion. In 1983 Baldwin United filed for Chapter 11 bankruptcy protection, and in 1985 MGIC was liquidated and its assets sold to Northwestern Mutual for $775 million. That same year, Karl and others set up a new company with the same name. In 1987, Bill Lacy was appointed chairman and chief executive officer of the company. Lacy died in 2016. In 1995, the founder of the company, Max H. Karl, died.

Headquarters
MGIC's four-story headquarters is located at 250 Kilbourn Avenue in downtown Milwaukee. The building was designed in an inverted pyramid shape by Fitzhug Scott-Architects, Inc. and Skidmore, Owings & Merrill and was completed in 1973. The building was extensively renovated by Eppstein Uhen Architects and Hunzinger Construction in 2019.

Community service 
MGIC supports many community organizations through donations and volunteering. They currently have programs and campaigns supporting United Way, Junior Achievement, United Performing Arts Fund, Milwaukee Public Television, Habitat for Humanity, Secure Futures and many other nonprofit organizations.

Honors
Mortgage Guaranty Insurance Corporation has been named a "Top Workplace" by the Milwaukee Journal Sentinel every year since 2010.

In 2015, MGIC was one of the winners of the Healthiest Employers awarded by the Milwaukee Business Journal. MGIC received a 2018 Platinum WELCOA Well Workplace Award.

References

External links 
 

Companies listed on the New York Stock Exchange
Financial services companies of the United States
Financial services companies established in 1957
American companies established in 1957
Real estate companies established in 1957
Real estate companies of the United States
Companies based in Milwaukee
Insurance companies of the United States
1957 establishments in Wisconsin
1982 mergers and acquisitions
Companies that filed for Chapter 11 bankruptcy in 1983